Dimitrov Cove is the 6.8 km wide cove indenting for 4.8 km the northwest coast of Velingrad Peninsula on Graham Coast in Graham Land, Antarctica, which is entered between Pripek Point to the west and Biser Point to the east.  Hoek Glacier and Rusalka Glacier flow into the cove, their termini separated by Veshka Point, while Camacúa Island is lying at the cove's entrance.

The cove is named after the Bulgarian historian Bozhidar Dimitrov for his support for the Bulgarian Antarctic programme.

Location
British mapping in 1971.

Maps
 British Antarctic Territory.  Scale 1:200000 topographic map. DOS 610 Series, Sheet W 65 64.  Directorate of Overseas Surveys, Tolworth, UK, 1971.
 Antarctic Digital Database (ADD). Scale 1:250000 topographic map of Antarctica. Scientific Committee on Antarctic Research (SCAR), 1993–2016.

References
 Dimitrov Cove. SCAR Composite Antarctic Gazetteer.
 Bulgarian Antarctic Gazetteer. Antarctic Place-names Commission. (details in Bulgarian, basic data in English)

External links
 Dimitrov Cove. Copernix satellite image

Coves of Graham Land
Bulgaria and the Antarctic
Graham Coast